In softball, a pitch is the act of throwing a ball underhand by using a windmill motion.  The pitcher will throw the ball towards home plate to a catcher to start the play.  The pitcher will attempt to strike out the batter or prevent the batters from getting on the bases.

The underhand pitch was the original baseball pitch.  Originally created as a sport for baseball players to maintain dexterity in the off season, softball gained so much popularity, it became its own sport.  In 1991, women's softball was added to the roster of the 1996 Summer Olympics.

References

Softball